The Bishop of Cashel and Ossory (Full title: Bishop of Cashel, Waterford and Lismore with Ossory, Ferns and Leighlin) is the Ordinary of the United Diocese of Cashel, Waterford and Lismore with Ossory, Ferns and Leighlin in the Church of Ireland. The diocese is in the ecclesiastical province of Dublin.

Overview and history
In 1833, the two provinces of Dublin and Cashel were merged. Over the centuries, numerous dioceses were merged, in view of declining membership. The same is true for this diocese where it can be seen that each of the entities listed in the title would have been a diocese in its own right. 

It is for this reason that the united diocese has six cathedrals (although the union of Waterford and Lismore predates the Reformation).

Cathedrals of the united diocese

 St. John's Cathedral, Cashel.
 Christ Church Cathedral, Waterford.
 St Carthage's Cathedral, Lismore.

 St. Canice's Cathedral, Kilkenny (Ossory).
 St Edan's Cathedral, Ferns.
 St Laserian's Cathedral, Old Leighlin.

List of bishops

See also

 List of Anglican diocesan bishops in Britain and Ireland
 List of Anglican dioceses in the United Kingdom and Ireland
 Synod of Cashel

References

External links
Diocese of Cashel and Ossory
 Crockford's Clerical Directory – Listings

Diocese of Cashel and Ossory
Cashel and Ossory
 
Cashel and Ossory